Luisetti is a surname. Notable people with the surname include:
 Federico Luisetti (fl. 2005—2017), Italian philosopher
 Hank Luisetti (1916–2002), American college men's basketball player